Maungakiekie-Tāmaki Ward is an Auckland Council ward which elects one councillor and covers the Maungakiekie-Tāmaki Local Board. The current councillor is Josephine Bartley.

Demographics

Maungakiekie-Tāmaki ward had a population of 76,284 at the 2018 New Zealand census, an increase of 6,279 people (9.0%) since the 2013 census, and an increase of 9,912 people (14.9%) since the 2006 census. There were 24,408 households, comprising 37,557 males and 38,727 females, giving a sex ratio of 0.97 males per female. The median age was 33.0 years (compared with 37.4 years nationally), with 15,381 people (20.2%) aged under 15 years, 18,132 (23.8%) aged 15 to 29, 34,659 (45.4%) aged 30 to 64, and 8,115 (10.6%) aged 65 or older.

Ethnicities were 43.8% European/Pākehā, 14.0% Māori, 25.7% Pacific peoples, 27.9% Asian, and 3.1% other ethnicities. People may identify with more than one ethnicity.

The percentage of people born overseas was 40.9, compared with 27.1% nationally.

Although some people chose not to answer the census's question about religious affiliation, 36.3% had no religion, 44.5% were Christian, 1.3% had Māori religious beliefs, 4.7% were Hindu, 2.6% were Muslim, 2.8% were Buddhist and 2.3% had other religions.

Of those at least 15 years old, 17,799 (29.2%) people had a bachelor's or higher degree, and 9,009 (14.8%) people had no formal qualifications. The median income was $33,500, compared with $31,800 nationally. 10,767 people (17.7%) earned over $70,000 compared to 17.2% nationally. The employment status of those at least 15 was that 32,556 (53.5%) people were employed full-time, 7,311 (12.0%) were part-time, and 2,943 (4.8%) were unemployed.

Councillors

Election Results 
Election Results for the Maungakiekie-Tāmaki Ward:

2022 Election Results

References

Wards of the Auckland Region